DCP may refer to:

Medicine
 Des-gamma carboxyprothrombin, a liver cancer marker
 Dicycloplatin, a chemotherapy medication
 Diphenylcyclopropenone, a medication for alopecia areata
 Dynamic compression plate, a metallic plate used in orthopedics

Chemistry
 Dichlorophenol, several chemical compounds which are derivatives of phenol
 1,3-Dichloropropene, an organochlorine pesticide
 Angiotensin-converting enzyme, an enzyme
 Dicalcium phosphate, a misnomer for dibasic calcium phosphate (CaHPO4)

Computing
 Digital Cinema Package, a distribution package
 Discovery and Configuration Protocol, a protocol within the PROFINET standard
 Dedicated charging port, a USB port type for charging which does not have data signals
 Disk Control Program, an MS-DOS derivative by East-German VEB Robotron

Other uses
 David Carrier Porcheron, a Canadian snowboarder
 Detroit Collegiate Preparatory Academy at Northwestern, now Northwestern High School, Michigan, US
 Dick Clark Productions, American television production company
 Disney College Program, a US national internship program
 Disney Consumer Products, a subsidiary of Disney Parks, Experiences and Products segment of the Walt Disney Company
 Dodge City Productions, a British music group
 Deputy Commissioner of Police (disambiguation), a senior rank in many police forces
 Data Collection Platform, an installation of meteorological instruments used in weather forecasting.

See also
 Disease Control Priorities Project (DCPP)